Burke "Buck" Deadrich (30 June 1945 – 18 November 2012) was an American wrestler, born in Oakland, California, who competed in the 1972 Summer Olympics.

Career
He became the Sports Information Director, wrestling coach and College Photographer at California Lutheran University in 1975. He is a 1969 graduate of Southern Illinois University and earned at master's degree from the University of California at Berkeley in 1975. Deadrich was an All-American wrestler while at Southern Illinois University, totaling a 162-4-9 record. He was five times the national freestyle wrestling champion, a member of the National Collegiate Wrestling Hall of Fame and a part of the 1972 U.S. Olympic team. In 1973, Deadrich attended the World University Games in Moscow, Russia and won a silver medal. That same year he also won a bronze medal in the Sambo event of the 1973 World Wrestling Championships in Tehran, Iran, and in 1974, in the world ranking 220 lbs category, he was number two. Deadrich was also awarded the Sports Journal Award for a film on wrestling in Russia, “Wrestling in Russia-Amateur Diplomacy.” He was five times the national freestyle wrestling champion, and twice the national Greco-Roman wrestling champion.

1973 Olympics results

1973 World Championships results
1st round: defeated Guerger Garynov of Bulgaria on points
2nd round: pinned Jose Trujillo of Spain
3rd round:

1973 Universiade results
1st round:
2nd round:
3rd round:

Retirement and later life
After becoming the wrestling coach at California Lutheran University in 1975, the college wrestling team improved, and during his tenure a number of CLU wrestlers competed in national events. Ed Fleming won silver in the Pan American Games of 1980, while Kim Coddington won 16 of 20 matches in 1977 and qualified for the national champion. Deadrich also recruited wrestlers to the college. Upon his resignation from the CLU, the college wrestling program struggled for about two years before being eliminated as a competitive college sport.

References

1945 births
2012 deaths
Sportspeople from Oakland, California
Olympic wrestlers of the United States
Wrestlers at the 1972 Summer Olympics
American male sport wrestlers
American sambo practitioners
Universiade medalists in wrestling
Universiade silver medalists for the United States
Medalists at the 1973 Summer Universiade